Meat and Candy is the debut studio album by American country music group Old Dominion. It was released on November 6, 2015 via RCA Records Nashville. The album includes the single "Break Up with Him", which has charted No. 1 on Country Airplay. The album's second single, "Snapback" released to country radio on January 11, 2016. The album's third single, "Song for Another Time" released to country radio on June 20, 2016.

Conception 
Songwriter and producer Shane McAnally came up with the album's name, using the words "meat and candy" to suggest the "heftier songs" and "lighter fare" respectively. For the album cover, the band found photographer Michael Elins, to create an image of a female soda jerk before a table covered with meat products and candy. Lead singer Matthew Ramsey told Rolling Stone that the album cover "shows our personality without showing us, and it definitely shows that we're trying to do something different".

Critical reception 
Giving it an "A−", Tammy Ragusa of Nash Country Weekly wrote that "The combination of catchy rhymes, clever lyrics, Matt Ramsey's warm, strong voice, and the band's subtle but delicious harmonie will have you singing, clapping, and dancing along." Stephen Thomas Erlewine of AllMusic rated the album 4 out of 5 stars, saying that "this is a sharper, savvier variation of Rascal Flatts: crossover pop as suited for an office as it is for a make-out session. That's an endorsement, not a dismissal: it's hard to sound this light and easy, but Old Dominion do it with aplomb and they're such talented craftsmen that Meat and Candy sounds better on the fifth play than it does on the first, and it sounds mighty fine that first time through."

Commercial performance 
The album debuted at No. 16 on the Billboard 200 and No. 5 on the Top Country Albums, selling 20,500 copies in its first week.  Within the first month of its release, on November 28, 2016, it was certified Gold by the RIAA. It peaked at No. 3 on the Country Albums chart on its 17th week of release in March 2016 due to sale at both iTunes and Google Play stores, with 10,200 sold for the week. The album has sold 192,900 copies in the US as of May 2017.

Track listing

Personnel

Old Dominion 
Matthew Ramsey – clapping, electric guitar, keyboards, lead vocals, background vocals, gang vocals
Trevor Rosen – clapping, acoustic guitar, hi-string guitar, keyboards, background vocals, gang vocals
Whit Sellers – drums, percussion, programming
Geoff Sprung – bass guitar, clapping, gang vocals
Brad Tursi – clapping, electric guitar, hi-string guitar, percussion, programming, background vocals, gang vocals

Additional musicians 
Dave Cohen – Hammond B-3 organ, piano, synthesizer, Wurlitzer electric piano
Mike Durham – electric guitar
Tommy Garris – gang vocals
Ryan Gore – percussion, programming
Devin Malone – electric guitar
Shane McAnally – gang vocals
Ben Phillips – programming 
Matt Stanfield – keyboards 
Ilya Toshinsky – banjo, acoustic guitar, electric guitar, resonator guitar, hi-string guitar, mandolin

Charts and certifications

Weekly charts

Year-end charts

Certifications

References 

2015 debut albums
RCA Records albums
Old Dominion (band) albums
Albums produced by Shane McAnally